Naguilian, officially the Municipality of Naguilian, is a 1st class municipality in the province of La Union, Philippines. According to the 2020 census, it has a population of 52,189 people.

History

Originally a part of Bauang in the province of Pangasinan, Naguilian derived its name from the Iloko phrase “Nag-ili-an dagiti gan-ganaet” meaning “a place where people from other places come to stay”. It is formed from the Iloko root word “ili” meaning “town” which was later modified as “Naguilian”.

Its separation from Bauang coincided with the centennial celebration of the Catholic Church of Naguilian in 1839. When La Union was created by a Royal Decree in 1850, Naguilian was one of the twelve (12) towns that comprised the province.

The founding of Naguilian
Due to increasing population density, a group of immigrants drifted to the shore of La Union and began building the town of Bauang at the south of the river and settled thereat. Later, however, due to population explosion, they followed the meander of the river in search of a new territory. They found a fertile valley at the bank of the river, which they called Naguilian. They built a colony at the fork of the two (2) rivers and began developing the territory. They were the first inhabitants of Naguilian.

Ethnic origin of the people
Records have shown that when the Ilocanos arrived in town, Igorot settlers are already at par. At present, “natives” as the Igorots are popularly called can still be found at the southern and northern parts of the town while majority of the Ilocanos are settled at the lowlands.

The subdivision of Naguilian
During its establishment as a town, it was believed that a few portions of Burgos and Bagulin were originally a part of Naguilian. These include the lower portion of Burgos known as “Disdis” meaning “a small barrio” and the barangays along the southwestern bank of the Naguilian River (Bagulin portion). “Disdis” was also called “Stancia” by the Spaniards as it served as a pasture ground for their horses while the portion which eventually became a part of Bagulin was predominantly inhabited by the Igorots.

However, during the American Regime, by virtue of a Resolution of the Provincial Government of La Union, Naguilian was divided into three portions namely, that portion which became the town of Naguilian, that portion forming part of Burgos and that portion forming part of Bagulin.

Political development
The earliest political system used during the Spanish colonial period was the “encomienda” system. Under this system, the native inhabitants in a given geographic region were entrusted to conquistadores, friars, and native nobles in exchange for their services to the King. In return, the person granted the encomienda, known as an encomiendero, were given the privilege to collect tribute from its inhabitants and to provide military protection, justice and governance. The encomienda system however was abused by encomienderos and by 1700 was largely replaced by administrative units. With the main purpose of governance and tax collection, small towns or pueblos were ruled by Gobernadorcillos and Capitanes.

Geography

Naguilian is characterized by hills and mountains that are gently rolling, bordered by the Cordillera Mountains in the east. The alienable lands are rolling plains in narrow strips, framed by the mountains slopes and the banks of rivers, crisscrossed by streams and springs from the side of the mountains. Its soil varies from clay loam to sandy loam and golds.

There are two major rivers in Naguilian. The Naguilian River is located in the western portion of the town. It flows westward beginning from the province of Benguet towards La Union and empties into the South China Sea, draining the valleys of Barangays Bimmotobot, Mamat-ing Sur, Mamat-ing Norte, Tuddingan, Gusing Sur, Gusing Norte, Baraoas Norte, Daramuangan, Dal-lipaoen, Cabaritan Sur, Ortiz, Natividad, Suguidan Norte, and Suguidan Sur. As classified by the Environmental Management Bureau, the upper reaches of the river falls under Class A which means that it is suitable as water supply source for drinking. The lower reaches have lower water quality, categorized under Class C.

The other major stream springs from the Municipality of Burgos and drains the valleys of Barangays Aguioas, Sili, Al-alinao Norte, Nagsidorisan, Angin, Suguidan Norte, and Natividad. These two rivers meet at the poblacion where it forms a delta, then meander through the center of the municipality and empty at the mouth of the river in Bauang.

Climate
The municipality's climate falls under the first type of climate in the Philippines, characterized by two (2) distinct seasons, wet and dry. The wet season usually comes in May and ends in the early part of October. The rest of the year is dry season.

Land use
Built-up areas of the town are generally spread along the barangay roads. Of the total land area, equivalent to 0.50% of the total land area, are classified as built-up areas. Urban built-up area, totaling , constitute 11.22% of the total urban land area. Rural built-up areas total , or 0.31% of the total rural area.

This is equivalent to .10% of the total land area of the town.

Barangays
Naguilian is politically subdivided into barangays. These barangays are headed by elected officials: Barangay Captain, Barangay Council, whose members are called Barangay Councilors. All are elected every three years.

Demographics

Economy

Agriculture
Generally, the agricultural lands are narrow strips in the valleys, running from the sides of the mountains to the bank of the rivers, brooks, and streams. The rolling areas from the top of the mountains and hills are also utilized for the planting of rice and other crops. The area devoted for agricultural purposes, which totals  constituting 97% of the total land area.

Industries
Industries in the different parts of the municipality include woodcraft, metal craft, bamboo craft, ceramics or brick making, concrete hollow block making, basi (sugarcane wine) making and furniture making and upholstery, .28% of the total land area of the town is devoted for industrial purposes.

Commerce
The center of commercial activities is the public market located in Barangay Ortiz. There are, however, other commercial establishments found in the different barangays, the most common of which are sari-sari stores. The area devoted to commerce constitutes .03% of the total land area of the town.

Fishery
Fishing is done in almost all barangays traversed by the rivers, namely, Barangays Bimmotobot, Mamat-ing Sur, Mamat-ing Norte, Gusing Norte, Gusing Sur, Baraoas Norte, Baraoas Sur, Ortiz, Cabaritan Norte, Cabaritan Sur, Dal-lipaoen, Nagsidorisan, Suguidan Norte, Suguidan Sur, Guesset, Sili, Al-alinao Norte, Al-alinao Sur, Aguioas, and Ribsuan.

Government
Naguilian, belonging to the second congressional district of the province of La Union, is governed by a mayor designated as its local chief executive and by a municipal council as its legislative body in accordance with the Local Government Code. The mayor, vice mayor, and the councilors are elected directly by the people through an election which is being held every three years.

Elected officials

Sister cities
Suisun City, California, United States of America

Notable personalities
Hermogenes F. Belen, Ilocano-language novelist, poet, and playwright

Gallery

References

External links

Official Website of the Provincial Government of La Union
Local Government Unit: Naguilian La Union
 [ Philippine Standard Geographic Code]
Philippine Census Information
Local Governance Performance Management System

Municipalities of La Union